The second season of the reality television series Love & Hip Hop: Miami will aired on VH1 from January 2, 2019 until March 25, 2019. The show was primarily filmed in Miami, Florida. It is executive produced by Mona Scott-Young and Stephanie R. Gayle and co-executive produced by Maricarmen Lopez for Monami Entertainment, Toby Barraud, Stefan Springman, David DiGangi, Dave Patry, Rich Allen and Thomas Jaeger for Eastern TV, and Nina L. Diaz, Liz Fine,  Vivian Gomez and Jihoon Zun for VH1.

The series chronicles the lives of several women and men in the Miami area, involved in hip hop music. It consists of 14 episodes, including a two-part reunion special hosted by Nina Parker.

Production
Season two of Love & Hip Hop: Miami began filming in June 2018. On September 6, 2018, Khaotic made headlines after he was allegedly involved in a hit-and-run incident while filming the show. 

On November 19, 2018, VH1 announced Love & Hip Hop: Miami would return for a second season on January 2, 2019, and air on Wednesday nights. Nearly all of the show's cast would return for a second season, with Jojo promoted to the main cast. New supporting cast members would include Haitian-American comedienne Jessie Woo, rapper Khaotic and Spectacular of Pretty Ricky. On December 18, 2018, VH1 began releasing "playback" interviews with Trina, Amara, Trick Daddy, Gunplay and Bobby, discussing their most dramatic moments from the first season, as well as their newfound fame from the show. On December 20, 2018, VH1 released the season's super trailer.

The season would be accompanied by an official podcast, Love & Hip Hop: The Tea, hosted by Jesse Janedy, TK Trinidad and Lem Gonsalves.

Reception
The show struggled with ratings compared to other Love & Hip Hop incarnations, which was attributed to its confusing scheduling changes. The season aired on Wednesday nights at 8pm/7c for the first two episodes, before being moved to 10pm/9c after Black Ink Crew: Chicago. After three weeks of low ratings, the show was moved back to Monday nights at 9pm/8c after Love & Hip Hop: New York.

Cast

Starring

 Trina (11 episodes)
 Prince (12 episodes)
 Amara La Negra (12 episodes)
 Shay Johnson (10 episodes)
 Gunplay (10 episodes)
 Veronica Vega (8 episodes)
 Bobby Lytes (13 episodes)
 Jojo Zarur (12 episodes)
 Trick Daddy (10 episodes)

Also starring

 Young Hollywood (11 episodes)
 Jessie Woo (10 episodes)
 Miami Tip (13 episodes)
 Joy Young  (9 episodes)
 Keyara Stone (8 episodes)
 Spectacular (8 episodes)
 Khaotic (13 episodes)
 Pleasure P (10 episodes)
 Baby Blue Whoaaaa (9 episodes)
 Michelle Pooch (7 episodes)
 Chinese Kitty (4 episodes)
 Liz Cifuentes (6 episodes)

Mami Ana, Faride Nemer and Chinese Nicky return in guest roles. Jullian Boothe and Ray Taylor appear in several episodes as guest stars. The show features minor appearances from notable figures within the hip hop industry and Miami's social scene, including Dreezy, Miss Mulatto, Rico Love, Slick 'Em of Pretty Ricky, Polow da Don, Alvin Kamara, radio personality Supa Cindy, MC Ceja, Trina's assistant Alvin, Bigg D, Lamb and Baby Blue and Spectacular's father Big Blue. Love & Hip Hop: Hollywoods Ray J and Lil Fizz make crossover appearances.

Episodes

Webisodes

Check Yourself
Love & Hip Hop Miami: Check Yourself, which features the cast's reactions to each episode, was released weekly with every episode on digital platforms.

Bonus scenes
Deleted and extended scenes from the season's episodes were released weekly as bonus content on VH1's official website.

Music
Several cast members had their music featured on the show and released singles to coincide with the airing of the episodes.

References

External links

2019 American television seasons

Love & Hip Hop